Bonneville is a village of Wallonia and a district of the municipality of Andenne, located in the province of Namur, Belgium.

The village church, dedicated to Saint Fermin, is a Romanesque building from the 11th century. Bonneville Castle is located in the village.

References

External links

Former municipalities of Namur (province)
Sub-municipalities of Andenne